William M. Napier (born 29 June 1940 in Perth, Scotland) is the author of five high tech thriller novels and a number of nonfiction science books.

Career

He received his Bachelor of Science degree in 1963 and his Doctor of Philosophy degree in 1966, both from the University of Glasgow.

Napier is a professional astronomer who has worked at the Royal Observatory in Edinburgh, the University of Oxford and Armagh Observatory. He is currently an honorary professor of Astrobiology in the Center for Astrobiology at Cardiff University, which describes him as "a leading figure in the dynamics and physics of comets, and a pioneer of the modern versions of catastrophism."   And honorary professor at the Buckingham Centre for Astrobiology, University of Buckingham, which describes him as, "a pioneer of modern studies of the impact hazard due to asteroids and comets," and also as having, "carried out an investigation of long-running claims of anomalous QSO/galaxy associations." His research work focuses on comets and cosmology. The result of his collaboration with Victor Clube and others on the role of giant comets in Earth history is known as "coherent catastrophism."

According to Napier, 13,000 years ago the earth was affected by a major, rapid cooling event that caused the extinction of a large number of species and a major disruption of paleoindian cultures.  Previously thought to have been caused by an enormous asteroid crashing into the planet, Napier presented evidence that the cooling event was caused by the collision with "a dense trail of material from a large disintegrating comet." He is a member of the Comet Research Group, which raises money for, and conducts research in, this area.

Selected bibliography

Fiction
Nemesis (1998), a science-fiction thriller
Revelation (2000)
The Lure (2002)
Shattered Icon (Splintered Icon in the US) (2003)
The Furies (2009) (St. Martin's Press)

Nonfiction
The Cosmic Serpent (1982), with Victor Clube
The Cosmic Winter (1990), with Victor Clube 
The Origin of Comets (1990), with M. E. Bailey and Victor Clube

References

External links
Armagh Observatory
Cardiff University Centre for Astrobiology

Living people
1940 births
Catastrophism
Scottish astronomers
Scottish novelists
William
Alumni of the University of Glasgow
Academics of Cardiff University
Astrobiologists
Writers from Perth, Scotland